The 2018–19 season is F.C. Motagua's 72nd season in existence and the club's 53rd consecutive season in the top fight of Honduran football.  As runners-up of both Apertura and Clausura last season, the club is looking for their 16th and 17th league title.  They also competed for the 2018 Honduran Cup and the 2018 CONCACAF League.

Overview
Coach Diego Vásquez will be leading the team for his 10th consecutive tournament.  Last season, Vásquez reached 200 consecutive games as Motagua's manager, a club's and league record.  The club started the season on 22 July with a shocking 1–2 defeat against Las Delicias F.C. in the 2018 Honduran Cup, making this the second time in a row they fall through the first round against a Liga Mayor club at such tournament.  On 1 November 2018, the club lost 2–3 on aggregate against C.S. Herediano in the final series of the 2018 CONCACAF League.  This marked the first time in history that the club qualified to a final in a tournament organized by CONCACAF.  With the defeat, Motagua failed to qualify to the 2019 CONCACAF Champions League.  Thanks to their outstanding participation in the first half of the season, coach Vásquez, as well as players Jonathan Rougier, Juan Montes and Rubilio Castillo were nominated at the 2018 CONCACAF Awards.  On 16 December 2018, the club conquered their 16th national title with a 2–1 aggregate score over their city rivals Club Deportivo Olimpia in the Apertura final series, a win which gave them the right to qualify to the 2019 CONCACAF League.  For their second year in a row, the club was voted as the best Honduran team according to Uruguayan newspaper El País.  In the Clausura tournament, Motagua repeated and once again lifted the trophy with a 3–2 win on aggregate over their city opponents Olimpia in the final series.

Kits
The 2018–19 home, away and third kits were published on 24 June.  On 5 December, the club released a special retro edition commemorating the 90th anniversary.

Players

Transfers in

Transfers out

Squad
 Statistics as of 2 June 2019
 Only league matches into account

Goalkeeper's action
 As of 2 June 2019

International caps
 As of 21 June 2019
This is a list of players that were playing for Motagua during the 2018–19 season and were called to represent Honduras at different international competitions.

Results
All times are local CST unless stated otherwise

Preseason and friendlies

Apertura

Clausura

Honduran Cup

CONCACAF League

By round

Statistics
 As of 2 June 2019

External links
 Official website

References

F.C. Motagua seasons
Motagua
Motagua